Union of Burkinabè Communists (in French: Union des Communistes Burkinabè) was a communist party in Burkina Faso. UCB was founded in August 1984 by the Group for the Unity of Marxists-Leninists (Groupe pour l'Unité des Marxistes-Léninistes, GUML, founded in 1983), the Marxist-Leninist Group (Groupe Marxiste-Léniniste, founded 1979 as split from PCRV) and one other group.

In 1986 it signed the appeal of four organizations for revolutionary unity and support to the revolutionary government of Thomas Sankara.

In 1987 Sankara tried to marginalize UCB. This was one of the factor that provoked the coup d'état, as UCB was close to the coup leader Blaise Compaoré. Together with smaller groups the UCB founded the Organization for Popular Democracy - Labour Movement in 1989.

Formerly ruling communist parties
Political parties established in 1984
Defunct political parties in Burkina Faso
Communist parties in Burkina Faso